Khed Alandi Assembly constituency is one of the 288 Vidhan Sabha (legislative assembly) constituencies of Maharashtra state, western India. This constituency is located in Pune district. It is a segment of Shirur (Lok Sabha constituency).

Geographical scope
The constituency comprises Khed taluka also known as Rajgurunagar.

Members of Legislative Assembly

^ by-poll

References

Assembly constituencies of Pune district
Assembly constituencies of Maharashtra